The Family Institute of Connecticut is an interdenominational, conservative 501(c)(3) non-profit advocacy organization founded in 1989. Its stated goal is to encourage and strengthen the family as the foundation of society and to promote Judeo-Christian ethical and moral values in the culture and government of Connecticut. It has been a vocal opponent of assisted suicide, abortion, and same-sex marriage in Connecticut. The organization is a Family Policy Council, meaning that it is the state affiliate of Focus on the Family.

The FIC comprises three organizations:

 The Family Institute of Connecticut focuses on marriage-strengthening projects, educational efforts, and research. It opposes abortion, assisted suicide, and same-sex marriage, promotes alternatives to public schools, and has programs to strengthen marriages for opposite-sex couples.
 FIC Action is a 501(c)(4) social welfare organization founded in 2004. It conducts political lobbying at the state level to oppose assisted suicide and previously lobbied against same-sex marriage.
 The Family Institute of Connecticut Action Committee is a registered state of Connecticut political action committee. FIC Action Committee was created in 2004 to promote candidates for Connecticut state government who are sympathetic to the organization's agenda.

Staff
 Peter Wolfgang, President, FIC Action & Executive Director, Family Institute of Connecticut
 Lawrence Taffner, Director of Operations
 Nicole Stacy, Director of Research

Board
 Ken Von Kohorn, Chairman
 Richard Caporaso, Treasurer
 John Hummel
 Gary G. Jackson
 Dick Kazarian
 Ed Morgan

Advisors
 Michael Jarjura, former mayor, Waterbury
 Win Smith, former state senator Milford
 Greg M. Hannan, attorney, Wallingford 
 Rev. LeRoy Bailey, Jr., Senior Pastor, The First Cathedral, Bloomfield
 Rabbi Yehoshua S. Hecht, Beth Israel Synagogue, Norwalk
 Rev. Earl M. Inswiller, Jr., Living Waters Fellowship Church, Windsor Locks

References

External links
 Official website

1989 establishments in Connecticut
Anti-abortion organizations in the United States
Non-profit organizations based in Connecticut
Political organizations based in the United States